Patrick Charles Murphy, M.D., (September 14, 1868 – March 6, 1925) was a Canadian Senator and physician.

Biography
Born in Kinkora, Prince Edward Island on September 14, 1868, Murphy became a physician and prominent citizen in Tignish. He was a Conservative candidate in the riding of Prince during the 1911 federal election but was defeated by 115 votes. The Conservatives came to power, however, and Murphy was appointed to the Senate in 1912 on the advice of the new prime minister, Robert Borden, and sat in the upper house as a Conservative until his death.

He died in Tignish on March 6, 1925.

References

External links
 

1868 births
1925 deaths
Physicians from Prince Edward Island
Canadian senators from Prince Edward Island
Conservative Party of Canada (1867–1942) candidates for the Canadian House of Commons
Conservative Party of Canada (1867–1942) senators
People from Tignish, Prince Edward Island
Prince Edward Island candidates for Member of Parliament